Kris Biantoro (born Rahmat Riyadi; 17 March 1938 – 13 August 2013) was an Indonesian actor and singer. Biantoro was master of ceremonies of the show Dansa yo Dansa on TVRI.

Biography
During his high school years at Yogyakarta in the 1950s, Biantoro began singing. He moved to Jakarta and later to Australia. He is the husband of Maria Nguyen Kim Dung, and lives in the Cibubur area. He has two children, as well as two grandchildren.

Discography
 "Mungkinkah"
 "Jangan Ditanya Kemana Aku Pergi"
 "Angela"
 "Juwita Malam"
 "Answer Me oh My Love"
 "The Impossible Dream"

Filmography
 Last Tango in Jakarta – 1973
 Si Manis Jembatan Ancol – 1973
 Bulan di Atas Kuburan – 1973
 Paul Sontoloyo – 1974
 Atheis – 1974
 Pilih Menantu – 1974
 Kuntianak – 1974
 Bajingan Tengik – 1974
 Bawang Putih – 1974
 Tiga Sekawan – 1975
 Akulah Vivian – 1977
 Kuda-Kuda Binal – 1978

Book
 Manisnya Ditolak ("Sweetness Denied") First edition, November 2004. The second edition, October 2006, includes a CD containing recordings of his songs.

References

External links

1938 births
Indonesian male film actors
Javanese people
2013 deaths
People from Magelang
Indonesian Roman Catholics